The RKW Group is a German manufacturer of plastic films headquartered in Mannheim. As of 2011 it was one of the top two plastic films companies in Europe and sold products in five markets:  industrial films, industrial packaging, consumer packaging, agricultural films and nets, and hygiene and medical films.  It had factories in Europe, Vietnam, Egypt, and the US.  In 2002, RKW took over four locations of former BP Plastec. In 2009, the company founded the first production facility on the African continent in Egypt. In 2015, it opened a plant in Guangzhou, China. The same year, RKW acquired plastic film producer Hyplast NV in Hoogstraten, Belgium. In the fiscal year 2018, RKW generated total sales of EUR 878 million, and about 3,000 employees processed 367,000 tonnes of plastic materials at more than 20 locations around the world. In 2019, RKW invested US$18.8 Million into its North American production site in Franklin, Kentucky. RKW was founded in 1957 by Jakob Müller as Rheinische Kunststoffwerke GmbH in Worms, Germany. The company is owned by the founder's family.

References

External links 
 

Manufacturing companies of Germany